West Island is a small island in the San Joaquin River, California. It is part of Sacramento County. It is shown, labeled "Webers Island", on an 1850 survey map of the San Francisco Bay area made by Cadwalader Ringgold and an 1854 map of the area by Henry Lange.

References

Islands of the San Francisco Bay Area
Islands of Sacramento County, California
Islands of the Sacramento–San Joaquin River Delta
Islands of Northern California